This section is administered by Bohusläns Fotbollförbund and Dalslands Fotbollförbund and has 12 teams: 
Eds FF | Grebbestads IF | Högsäter | Kungshamns IF | IFK Lane | Skärhamns IK | Stångenäs AIS | Svarteborg Dingle IF | Uddevalla IS | Vallens IF | IF Viken | Åsebro IF 
Source - Results & League Table 2012:  svenskfotboll.se

Season to season

1967

1968

1969

* IK Columbia Withdrawn from league after merge with IFK Vänersborg

Footnotes

External links
 

Sport in Västra Götaland County